is a Japanese manga series by Kodama Kawashiri. It has been serialized online via Twitter since September 2020 and has been collected in two tankōbon volumes by Kadokawa Shoten. An anime television series adaptation by Lapin Track aired from January to August 2022.

Characters

Media

Manga

Anime
An anime television series adaptation by Lapin Track was announced on September 9, 2021.  The series is directed by Shingo Kaneko, with Yayoi Takano designing the characters and Yuma Yamaguchi composing the music.  It aired from January 14 to August 12, 2022, within the EXITV~FOD no Shinsaku Meisaku wo Pon! Pon! Misemakuri!!~ variety program on Fuji TV and on the Japanese streaming service Fuji TV on Demand. The series ran for 24 episodes. Crunchyroll licensed the series.

Episode list

Reception
In 2021, the manga was nominated for the Next Manga Awards in the digital category, and was ranked 11th out of 50 nominees.

Notes

References

External links
 

2022 anime television series debuts
Anime series based on manga
Autobiographical anime and manga
Autobiographical webcomics
Crunchyroll anime
Fuji TV original programming
Japanese webcomics
Kadokawa Shoten manga
Slice of life anime and manga
Webcomics in print